The Australia national beach soccer team represents Australia in international men's beach soccer. The team is controlled by the governing body for association football in Australia, Football Federation Australia (FFA), which is currently a member of the Asian Football Confederation (AFC) and the regional ASEAN Football Federation (AFF) since leaving the Oceania Football Confederation (OFC) in 2006. The team's official nickname is the Beach Socceroos.

The team has represented Australia at the FIFA Beach Soccer World Cup tournaments on one occasion, in 2005.

Competitive record

FIFA Beach Soccer World Cup

AFC Beach Soccer Championship

Honours

AFC Beach Soccer Championship
Fourth place (1): 2013

References

External links
 Beach Soccer Worldwide: Australia

Asian national beach soccer teams
beach soccer